Vladimir Semyonovich Timoshenko (born 26 May 1943) is a career diplomat and is a former ambassador of the Russian Federation to Benin.

In December 2002, Timoshenko was appointed as Ambassador of Russia to Benin, with concurrent accreditation to Togo, and held this appointment until his retirement on 30 June 2008.

Timoshenko speaks Russian, English, French and Ukrainian.

References 

Living people
Russian people of Ukrainian descent
Ambassadors of Russia to Benin
Ambassadors of Russia to Togo
1943 births